Chiara Cainero (born 24 March 1978) is an Italian sport shooter who won a gold medal in Skeet at the 2008 Summer Olympics.

At the age of 41 she qualified for the Tokyo Olympics 2020.

Biography
Cainero has competed at three Olympic Games, becoming the first Italian woman to win gold in skeet shooting at the Beijing Olympics.  She has also won a silver and a bronze medal at the ISSF world championships.

Cainero is an athlete of the Centro Sportivo Carabinieri.

Achievements

See also
Italian sportswomen multiple medalists at Olympics and World Championships

References

External links

1978 births
Living people
Italian female sport shooters
Olympic shooters of Italy
Skeet shooters
Shooters at the 2004 Summer Olympics
Shooters at the 2008 Summer Olympics
Shooters at the 2012 Summer Olympics
Shooters at the 2016 Summer Olympics
Olympic gold medalists for Italy
Olympic silver medalists for Italy
Sportspeople from Udine
Olympic medalists in shooting
Medalists at the 2008 Summer Olympics
Medalists at the 2016 Summer Olympics
Shooters at the 2015 European Games
European Games bronze medalists for Italy
European Games medalists in shooting
Shooters at the 2019 European Games
European Games gold medalists for Italy
Shooters of Gruppo Sportivo Forestale
Shooters of Centro Sportivo Carabinieri
Shooters at the 2020 Summer Olympics